Graham Pearce may refer to:
 Graham Pearce (English footballer) (born 1963), English association football player who played for Brighton and Hove Albion in the 1983 FA Cup Final
 Graham Pearce (New Zealand footballer), New Zealand international association football player 
 Graham Pearce (runner) (born ?), British runner

See also
Pearce (disambiguation)